The Latin phrase bellum se ipsum alet or bellum se ipsum alit, and its German rendering Der Krieg ernährt den Krieg describe the military strategy of feeding and funding armies primarily with the resources of occupied territories. It is closely associated with mass starvation in the population of these territories. The phrase, coined by Ancient Roman statesman Cato the Elder, is primarily associated with the Thirty Years' War (1618–1648).

The phrase

The phrase bellum se ipsum alet was first mentioned in Ab urbe condita libri XXXIV,9,12, written by Roman historian Titus Livius (Livy) (59 BC-17 AD), who attributed it to Cato Marcus Porcius ("the Elder", 234–149 BC), a statesman in Ancient Rome. According to Livy, Cato in 195 BC used the phrase during the conquest of Hispania when he refused to buy additional supplies for his army in Iberia (Hispania, modern Spain and Portugal).

The slogan became prominent in reference to the Thirty Years' War. Friedrich Schiller in his retrospect, semi-historical drama Wallenstein (I/2, The Piccolomini), has Johann Ludwig Hektor von Isolani, a general in Albrecht von Wallenstein's army, say these words in a conversation with other commanders:

The strategy

Thirty Years' War

Prior to the Thirty Years' War, the laws of the Holy Roman Empire provided for funding armies by raising special war taxes. The funds needed for the large armies raised during the war however exceeded the income of the respective warlords from those taxes, and forced them to resort to additional, unfavourable measures such as borrowing of money and currency depreciation. In the course of the war, the principle of bellum se ipsum alet was applied in two phases: First, the food supplies needed for the army were derived directly from the territory occupied by this army. Later, the pay for the soldiers was derived from the occupied territory as well.

In 1623, the principle was implemented by the Upper Saxon Circle on its own territory, and by Johann Tserclaes, Count of Tilly, commander of the Catholic League's army, on occupied enemy territory. The Upper Saxon Circle had raised an army for its defense, and dispersed it over its territory. The territory was divided into Kontributionsbezirke ("contribution districts"), each of which had to provide certain amounts of food for the soldiers as well as the horses. The soldiers were quartered in the houses of ordinary people, who had to provide shelter, food and Servisgeld, a defined sum to allow the soldier to buy firewood and salt. 

These measures were self-imposed by the circle's nobility, and the local authorities were given the task of their implementation. In contrast, Tilly imposed analogous measures in the same year on a territory he had just conquered, Hersfeld. The contributions he demanded were unreasonably high, and were collected with military means.

In 1625, Albrecht von Wallenstein had promised Holy Roman Emperor Ferdinand II to raise an army and fund it himself. Ferdinand II allowed Wallenstein to exploit occupied territory with the caveat that money should not be collected by force without his approval. This caveat was however neglected, and the army was fed and paid entirely by contributions and war loot. Subsequently, all armies participating in the war adapted the bellum se ipsum alet principle. 

Contributions from occupied territories, divided into Kontributionsbezirke, were collected by military force and by local authorities forced to cooperate. The affected territories were thereby ruined. The need to borrow money to satisfy the military demands during the Thirty Years' War resulted in an indebtedness that many German communities bore until the 18th century.

World War II

During World War II Nazi Germany invaded the Soviet Union in 1941. The conquered territories did not return as many resources as the Nazis had expected, due to previous shortfalls of the Soviet planned economy and the devastations during the conquest. Thus, Reichsmarschall Hermann Göring implemented restrictions on the local population to prevent the Altreich and the army from falling short of food supplies. 

Aware of the consequences of these measures, Göring in September 1941 foretold "the largest starvation since the Thirty Years' War" in the occupied areas. In 1942, he explicitly described the Nazi strategy in these territories as bellum se ipsum alet.

See also
Scorched earth, a strategy designed to counter bellum se ipsum alet

Notes

Sources

References

Bibliography

Latin words and phrases
Military economics
Military strategy
Thirty Years' War